The Central African Republic made its Paralympic Games debut by sending a delegation to compete at the 2004 Summer Paralympics in Athens, Greece, having made its Olympic debut in 1968. The delegation consisted in a single athlete, Thibaut Bomaya, who competed in the powerlifting. He did not win a medal, finishing in 11th place in the single round for the men's 56kg.

Background
The Central African Republic first participated in a Summer Olympics at the 1968 Games in Mexico City, Mexico. They participated on seven occasions up to and including the 2004 Summer Olympics in Athens, Greece, but failed to win any medals along the way. 

Members representing the Central African Republic joined the International Paralympic Committee in 2001, and made debut attendance at the IPC General Assembly in Athens on 7 December that year. The nation made its debut at the following Summer Paralympics in 2004, which also took place in Athens.

Powerlifting

He finished ahead of Eduard Gisov of Kyrgyzstan and South Korea's Yoon Sang Jin. In addition, Syria's Youssef Cheikh Younes was disqualified following a positive test for doping; he had previous finished in the bronze medal position. Wang Jian of China won the gold medal, lifting .

Powerlifting

See also
Central African Republic at the Paralympics
Central African Republic at the 2004 Summer Olympics

References

Nations at the 2004 Summer Paralympics
2004
Summer Paralympics